The Junkers G 31 was an advanced tri-motor airliner produced in small numbers in Germany in the 1920s. Like other Junkers types, it was an all-metal, low-wing cantilever monoplane. In the mid-1920s, the all-metal construction and an aerodynamically 'clean' configuration were remarkable.

Development
Professor Junkers wanted to follow up on the commercial success of the tri-motor G 24 with a new design that would be larger, more comfortable for passengers, and simpler to operate and maintain.

The G 31 was the first Luft Hansa airliner to feature a flight attendant (Wagner p. 264), who served food and drinks (which were not complimentary). This earned the G 31 the nickname 'flying dining car' ('fliegender Speisewagen' in German). Because of its large fuselage it was also called the flying moving van ('fliegender Möbelwagen' in German). Behind the cockpit were compartments for a radio operator, baggage and an APU that provided compressed air for main engine starting and drove a generator for electric power. The cabin was divided into three compartments that held eleven regular passenger seats, four jumpseats for passengers, a jumpseat for the steward, and an enclosed lavatory. Instead of the passenger seats, ten beds could be made up for night flying. There was a baggage and freight hold under the cabin. The wings had trailing edge flaps that reduced the landing speed by ten percent (Wagner p. 267).

Professor Junkers originally requested the G 31 have landing gear that would retract into the wings. After extensive wind tunnel experiments Ernst Zindel, the leader of the design team, persuaded Professor Junkers that the gain in speed provided by reduced air resistance, would not outweigh the increased weight, cost and complexity of either retractable landing gear or simple wheel fairings. The tailskid incorporated a roller, to avoid damage to grass airfields(Wagner p. 262–263).

The intended powerplant was three Junkers L5 engines. When these proved too weak, it was suggested to use the Napier Lion, considered to be the best aero engine at the time ("the best engine for the best plane"). This however was too expensive, especially since it would have had to be paid for in convertible currency, not German Reichsmark. Most G 31s flew with foreign air-cooled radial engines in the 500 hp range, which were licence-built in Germany (see list of variants below)(Wagner p. 265–267).

Operational history
Originally, the G 31 had been intended to equip Junkers' own airline, Junkers Luftverkehr, but this venture was merged into Deutsche Luft Hansa in 1926, and the new airline purchased only eight G 31s, beginning operations in May 1928. They were used on the long-range routes of Luft Hansa, particularly to Scandinavia. They continued in this role until 1935, when replaced by the Junkers Ju 52.

Four other G 31s were sold for freighting cargo in New Guinea. Operated by Guinea Airways, one was owned by the airline itself, while the other three were owned by the Bulolo Gold Dredging Company. Powered by Pratt & Whitney Hornets, these differed from the G 31 airliners in having open cockpits, and a large hatch in the fuselage roof to accommodate the loading of bulky cargo via crane. In one particular operation, the G 31s were used to airlift eight 3,000 tonne (3,310 ton) dredges (in parts) from Lae to Bulolo. Three of the aircraft were destroyed in a Japanese air raid on Bulolo on 21 January 1942, and the remaining aircraft was pressed into RAAF service ten days later. This machine (construction number 3010, registration VH-UOW) was seriously damaged in an accident at Laverton, Victoria on 31 October that year after it careened off the runway and collided with and destroyed the Minister for Air's car. Although judged beyond repair by the Air Force, it eventually returned to freighter use in New Guinea for some time after the war.

Unlike the earlier Junkers G 24, the G 31 was not a commercial success, only 13 being sold, as opposed to 54 civilian G 24s (+30 military derivatives)(Wagner p. 267). Compared to the G 24 it offered passengers more comfort. Compared to the more usual biplane airliners of the 1920s, the G 31 was faster, and its all-metal construction made it safer. However purchase price and operating costs were high. Instead of the newly designed G 31, a developed version of the G 24 might have sold better.

Accidents and incidents
September 25, 1928 Deutsche Luft Hansa G 31de (c/n J3004; registration D-1427; named Deutschland) crash landed and burned due to an engine fire.
December 11, 1928 Deutsche Luft Hansa G 31fi, registration D-1473 and named Rhineland, crashed at Letzlingen due to weather, killing three of four on board.
May 1936 An RLM G 31fo (c/n 3008, D-ABIL) collided with Junkers Ju 52/3m D-APUT.

Variants

 G 31.1 – prototype with three Junkers L5 engines
 G 31.2 – as G 31.1 with centre engine replaced with BMW VI
 G 31ba – production version of G 31.2
 G 31de – version with three Gnome et Rhone-built Bristol Jupiter VI engines, enclosed cockpit and second tailfin
 G 31fi – version with three Siemens-built Bristol Jupiter engines, and enlarged wing and fuselage
 G 31fo – version with three BMW-built Pratt & Whitney Hornet engines
 G 31ho – as G 31fo with centre engine replaced with Pratt & Whitney Hornet
 G 31go – freighter version for New Guinea with open cockpit and 3.60 m × 1.50 m (11 ft 10 in × 5 ft) cargo hatch in roof.

Operators

Trust Territory of New Guinea
Royal Australian Air Force

Deutsche Luft Hansa

Specifications (G 31fo)

See also

References

External links

 Civil Aviation Historical Society website
 Hugo Junkers homepage
 Уголок неба
 1930 Flight article on Guinea Airways G 31

1920s German airliners
G 31
Trimotors
Low-wing aircraft